Potanthus confucius, the Chinese dart or Confucian dart, is a butterfly belonging to the family Hesperiidae. They are found from Sri Lanka, India to China and Japan and down to Sumatra and Java in Indonesia. Some museum specimens have also been reported to be from Palawan in the Philippines, but due to the absence of the species in Borneo, it is possible that these were mislabeled or misidentified.

Subspecies
P. c. diana (Evans, 1932) - Maharashtra to Kerala
P. c. dushta (Fruhstorfer, 1911) - Sikkim, northeast India to Indochina
P. c. nina (Evans, 1932) - Andaman and Nicobar Islands

References

Potanthus
Confucius
Butterflies of Indochina
Butterflies described in 1862